John Richard Coulter (born 3 December 1930) is an Australian medical researcher and former politician. He was the fourth elected parliamentary Senate leader of the Australian Democrats, serving from 2 October 1991 to 29 April 1993. His understanding of conservation and environment principles was exceptional for the time, though his concern about Australian immigration and population growth occasionally brought him into conflict with the party's non-discriminatory humanitarian and human-rights platforms and got him nicknamed "Doctor Who" by the Australian media.

Coulter was born in Perth, Western Australia. He gained a Bachelor of Medicine and Surgery degree at the University of Adelaide. He became a medical practitioner and researcher, and was also a university lecturer.

He was a member of Campbelltown Council in Adelaide during 1973–74. In 1980 he joined the Democrats.

He first took office in the Senate in 1987, representing South Australia, and resigned from the Senate on 20 November 1995, due to ill health. Natasha Stott Despoja was appointed as his replacement three days later, having earlier been employed by him as a researcher.

In 1999, he was publicly critical of Meg Lees's leadership of the Democrats, especially of her handling of the Goods and Services Tax legislation. He believed Stott Despoja would make a better leader, and was working towards that goal, which she in fact attained in April 2001.

However, a week before the November 2001 federal election, Coulter resigned from the party because he believed Stott Despoja had reduced internal party democracy. He said she had taken the party further away from the grassroots, that it had become pragmatic, and that he could not recommend that people vote for the party.

References

 Biography for COULTER, John Richard
 ABC: Coulter responds to Lee's (sic) attack
 ABC: Democrats dismiss Coulter's comments
 

1930 births
Living people
Australian Democrats members of the Parliament of Australia
Members of the Australian Senate
Members of the Australian Senate for South Australia
Leaders of the Australian Democrats
20th-century Australian politicians